Kamalpreet Singh (born 15 November 1997) is an Indian professional footballer who plays as a defender for Real Kashmir in the I-League.

Career
Born in Punjab, Singh began his career at the AIFF Elite Academy where he played along with both the India youth sides.

Minerva Punjab
Singh was announced to be part of the Minerva Punjab side for the I-League 2nd Division in November 2015. On 8 January 2017, he made his professional debut for the club in the I-League against Chennai City. He started and played the full match as Minerva Punjab drew 0–0.

International
Singh has represented India at both the under-16 and under-19 sides.

Career statistics

Club

Honours

Club
Minerva Punjab
I-League: 2017–18

References

Living people
People from Punjab, India
Indian footballers
RoundGlass Punjab FC players
Association football defenders
Footballers from Punjab, India
I-League 2nd Division players
I-League players
India youth international footballers
1997 births
East Bengal Club players
Indian Super League players
Odisha FC players
Real Kashmir FC players